Richard Dessureault-Dober, Jr. (born January 21, 1981) is a Canadian sprint kayaker who has competed since the mid-2000s. He won two medals at the ICF Canoe Sprint World Championships with a silver (K-2 500 m: 2006) and a bronze (K-2 200 m: 2009).

Dessureault-Dober, Jr. also competed in two Summer Olympics, earning his best finish of sixth in the K-2 500 m event at Beijing in 2008.

References
Canoe09.ca profile 

Sports-reference.com profile

1981 births
Canadian male canoeists
Canoeists at the 2004 Summer Olympics
Canoeists at the 2008 Summer Olympics
Canoeists at the 2011 Pan American Games
Living people
Olympic canoeists of Canada
ICF Canoe Sprint World Championships medalists in kayak
Pan American Games gold medalists for Canada
Pan American Games silver medalists for Canada
Pan American Games medalists in canoeing
Medalists at the 2011 Pan American Games